Jalalabad (also Romanized as Jalālābād) is a village in Nezamabad Rural District, in the Central District of Azadshahr County, Golestan Province, Iran. At the 2006 census, its population was 1,044, in 245 families.

References 

Populated places in Azadshahr County